Linden is a New Jersey Transit station on the Northeast Corridor in Linden, New Jersey, United States. It is served by the Northeast Corridor and North Jersey Coast lines and located downtown on an embankment south of South Wood Avenue. 

This station has two high-level side platforms on six tracks. The four middle tracks are used by New Jersey Transit express trains as well as Amtrak's Northeast Regional, Acela Express, Keystone service.

Station layout
The Trenton-bound platform for Track B is nearly twice as long as the New York-bound one for Track A. On its northern end, it has a long staircase up to it from Wood Avenue, which runs under the line, alongside a driveway that leads into the 464 space parking lot along this platform. The staircase has a short landing a gated off wooden low-level platform that stretches through all six tracks. The platform is canopied for its first quarter length with a small enclosed shelter. There is another staircase and ramp, which ends nearly at the platform's northern end, down to the parking lot here. By the staircase are two shelters, one enclosing parking Muni-Meters and the other two Ticket Vending Machines. Towards the platform's southern end has another staircase to the parking lot near its main entrance from Elizabeth Avenue. 

The Wood Avenue overpass has an abandoned staircase between Track A  and 1 that led up to a small low-level platform for Tracks 1 and 2. The tracks are labeled in the underpass with small black numbers and letters.

The shorter New York-bound platform is entirely canopied with green supports. It begins on the northern side of the Wood Avenue overpass with the back of its windscreen painted blue and a "Welcome to Linden" message. The historic station house runs along the south side of the street adjacent to this platform. It is a cream colored building with green trim and a green roof with a now unstaffed waiting room. Inside are wooden benches with arms and the closed ticket window. Behind the station house are two shelters, one covering Ticket Vending Machines and the other parking Muni-Meters, and the only staircase up to the platform. This leads to a 141-space parking lot with entrances from Wood Avenue and Penn Place. At the platform's southern end is a blocked off staircase going down to low-level wooden platforms and long wheelchair ramp that leads down into the parking lot.

Amtrak's Northeast Corridor services bypass the station via the inner tracks.

References

External links

 Station House from Google Maps Street View

NJ Transit Rail Operations stations
Stations on the Northeast Corridor
Railway stations in Union County, New Jersey
Linden, New Jersey
Former Pennsylvania Railroad stations